Michael Geerts (born 17 January 1995) is a Belgian tennis player.

Geerts has a career high ATP singles ranking of 231 achieved on 15 August 2022. He also has a career high ATP doubles ranking of 226 achieved on 12 September 2022. Geerts competes mainly on the ATP Challenger Tour circuit.

Geerts made his ATP main draw debut at the 2020 European Open in the doubles draw partnering Yannick Mertens.

Challenger and Futures/World Tennis Tour Finals

Singles: 13 (7–6)

References

External links

 
 

1995 births
Living people
Belgian male tennis players
Sportspeople from Antwerp